Professor, My Son (also known as My Son, the Professor) is a 1946 Italian  comedy-drama film written and directed by Renato Castellani.

Plot  
The janitor of a Roman school (Aldo Fabrizi) seeks social redemption by allowing his child, through many sacrifices, to study until becoming a teacher in the very school where he himself works.

Cast 

Aldo Fabrizi as Orazio Belli
Giorgio De Lullo as  Orazio Belli jr.
Mario Pisu as  Ettore Giraldi
Diana Nava as  Diana Giraldi
Lisetta Nava as  Lisetta Giraldi
Pinuccia Nava as  Mrs. Maggi / Pinuccia Giraldi
Nando Bruno as  Angeloni 
Mario Soldati as  Professor Bardelli
Ercole Patti as Teacher
Ennio Flaiano as Teacher
Vincenzo Talarico as  Teacher

References

External links

1946 films
Films directed by Renato Castellani
Films scored by Nino Rota
Italian black-and-white films
Italian comedy-drama films
1946 comedy-drama films
1940s Italian films